Marcin Bułka (born 4 October 1999) is a Polish professional footballer who plays as a goalkeeper for Ligue 1 club Nice.

Club career

Early career 
Bułka began his career in his native Poland, playing in the youth ranks at Stegny Wyszogród, MDK Król Maciuś Club Płock and FCB Escola Varsovia, an official Barcelona satellite academy in Poland. In March 2016, whilst at FCB Escola Varsovia, Bułka underwent a trial with Barcelona, before trialling at English club Chelsea the following month.

Chelsea 
In the summer of 2016, Bułka joined Chelsea. In September 2016, he signed his first professional contract with the club as well as making his under-18 debut for in a 4–2 win against Arsenal U18. In the 2018–19 season, Bułka featured on the bench three times for Chelsea's first team.

Paris Saint-Germain

2019–20: Debut season 
In July 2019, Bułka signed for Ligue 1 club Paris Saint-Germain (PSG) on a two-year contract, after the expiration of his contract at Chelsea. On 30 August 2019, he made his debut for the club, keeping a clean sheet in a 2–0 win against Metz. He would end the 2019–20 season making only one appearance, as he was the third keeper of PSG.

2020–21: Cartagena and Châteauroux loans 
Bułka made his first and only appearance for PSG in the 2020–21 season in the first match of the campaign on 10 September 2020, which was against newly-promoted Lens. With Keylor Navas and Sergio Rico absent, he would play the entirety of the match, but made a costly mistake that handed Lens a 1–0 win.

On 28 September, Bułka signed a contract extension with Paris Saint-Germain until June 2025. He was immediately loaned out to Spanish Segunda División club Cartagena. Eventually, his loan was cut short, and he left in the January transfer window.

On 31 January 2021, Ligue 2 club Châteauroux signed Bułka on loan until the end of the season. He made his debut in a 4–0 win against Chambly on 2 February. However, in late February, he suffered an injury to his right ankle, ruling him out of play for "several weeks" according to the club. Bułka made his return to play in a 1–0 loss to Toulouse on 17 April.

Nice 
On 5 August 2021, Bułka joined Ligue 1 side Nice on loan with an option-to-buy. During the 2021–22 season, he played in all of the club's Coupe de France matches, and one league match against Clermont. On 1 June 2022, his move to Nice was made permanent.

International career
After previously representing Poland at under-18 and under-19 level, on 6 September 2018, Bułka made his under-20 debut for Poland against Italy U20 in a 3–0 loss.

Personal life
On 27 May 2020, Bułka was involved in a traffic collision near the town of Wyszogród, Poland. He was driving a rented Lamborghini on a motorway and collided with an individual driving a Hyundai in the opposite direction while attempting an overtake maneuver. A 56–year old was injured during the crash and suffered several fractures, while Bułka was left unharmed. Bułka admitted the responsibility for the collision, and could face up to three years in jail after potentially breaking article 177 of Polish law.

Career statistics

Honours
Chelsea

 U18 Premier League: 2016–17, 2017–18
FA Youth Cup: 2016–17, 2017–18
U18 Premier League Cup: 2017–18

 UEFA Youth League runner-up: 2017–18

Paris Saint-Germain
Ligue 1: 2019–20

Nice

 Coupe de France runner-up: 2021–22

References

External links

1999 births
Living people
Sportspeople from Płock
Association football goalkeepers
Polish footballers
Poland under-21 international footballers
Poland youth international footballers
Ligue 1 players
Segunda División players
Ligue 2 players
Chelsea F.C. players
Paris Saint-Germain F.C. players
FC Cartagena footballers
LB Châteauroux players
OGC Nice players
Polish expatriate footballers
Expatriate footballers in England
Expatriate footballers in France
Expatriate footballers in Spain
Polish expatriate sportspeople in England
Polish expatriate sportspeople in France
Polish expatriate sportspeople in Spain